Best Kept Secret may refer to:
Best Kept Secret (film)
Best Kept Secret (festival)
Best Kept Secret (novel), a novel by Jeffrey Archer
Best Kept Secret (production team)
"Best Kept Secret" (song), a song by Didrik Solli-Tangen
Best Kept Secret (management company)

Albums
The Best Kept Secret (Alphrisk album)
The Best Kept Secret (Jerry Douglas album)
Best Kept Secret (Sheena Easton album)
Best Kept Secrets: The Best of Lamb 1996–2004
Best Kept Secret (Louieville Sluggah album)
Best Kept Secret (Jennifer Paige album)
Best Kept Secret (Slum Village album)
The Best Kept Secret (Ultramagnetic MCs album)
Best Kept Secrets (Ghost Light album)
Best Kept Secret (Soopafly album), an album by Soopafly
Best Kept Secret, an album by Alquin
Best Kept Secret, a demo album by Leona Lewis

See also
The Best Little Secrets Are Kept, an album by Louis XIV